Qarabulaq (or ) is a village and municipality in the Goygol District of Azerbaijan on the recently asphalted lane between Chaykand and Sarisu. The village had an Armenian majority prior to the First Nagorno-Karabakh War and Operation Ring.

History 
The Armenian population of the village was forcefully evicted by Soviet special forces during Operation Ring in 1991. The fact that the population was able to successfully flee is often attributed to the actions of Simon Achikgyozyan of the Arabo Detachment. Achikgyozyan died on 30 April 1991, defending the town by concentrating the fire from oncoming tanks against himself while the townspeople fled through the forests to safety. The Armenian population of the village was forcibly deported and now live as refugees in the Republic of Artsakh.

References 

Populated places in Goygol District
Former Armenian inhabited settlements